Thomas Francis Cusack (February 22, 1862 – July 12, 1918) was an American clergyman of the Roman Catholic Church. He served as Bishop of Albany from 1915 until his death in 1918.

Biography
Thomas Cusack was born in New York City to James and Honora (née Boland) Cusack. His parents were Irish immigrants who came to the United States on their honeymoon. His childhood was spent on the Lower East Side, and he made his early studies at the parochial school of St. James Church. He then attended St. Francis Xavier's College, from where he graduated in 1880. His theological studies were made at St. Joseph's Seminary in Troy, where Cusack was ordained to the priesthood on May 30, 1885.

His first assignment was to St. Teresa's Church, where he remained until he was named pastor of St. Peter's Church in Rosendale in 1890. In 1897, he resigned his pastorate to organize the Archdiocesan Mission Society, of which he was also made superior. During the Spanish–American War, he served as chaplain at Camp Chickamauga in Georgia.

On March 11, 1904, Cusack was appointed auxiliary bishop of New York and titular bishop of Themiscyra by Pope Pius X. He received his episcopal consecration on the following April 25 from Archbishop John Murphy Farley, with Bishops Charles H. Colton and James Augustine McFaul serving as co-consecrators, in St. Patrick's Cathedral. In addition to his episcopal duties, he served as pastor of St. Stephen's Church from 1904 to 1915.

Cusack was named the fifth Bishop of Albany by Pope Benedict XV on July 5, 1915. During his brief tenure, he supported the war effort during World War I, renovated the Cathedral of the Immaculate Conception with electric lights and marble flooring, and established Catholic Charities in the diocese. After three years in Albany, he died at the age of 56.

References

1862 births
1918 deaths
Roman Catholic bishops of Albany
American military chaplains
Clergy from New York City
20th-century Roman Catholic bishops in the United States
Spanish–American War chaplains
19th-century American Roman Catholic priests
American Roman Catholic clergy of Irish descent